Kathryn Joy Reynolds (born 1962, now McPhee) is a former Australian politician. She was an Australian Democrats member of the South Australian Legislative Council from 2003 to 2006.

Prior to 2003, Reynolds operated her own business On-Track Training, wrote two books (Just a Tick - A Best Practice Survival Guide for Committees and Boards of Management and Take Your Partner for the Corporate Tango) and taught community development at TAFE. Before entering politics she was instrumental in the establishment of the Torrens Valley Community Centre and was active on various local committees including the Adelaide Hills Tourism Association.  From 1997 to 2003 she served on the Policy Council of SACOSS.  She served a term as an elected member on the District Council of Mount Pleasant prior to its amalgamation with the Barossa Council. Reynolds was the Democrats candidate for the safe Liberal seat of Schubert at the 2002 state election, polling a credible 8.9% of the vote. She received a second opportunity a year later when she was selected by the party to fill a casual vacancy in the Legislative Council caused by the resignation from politics of then-Democrats leader Mike Elliott.

During her time as a sitting member, Reynolds spoke out on a range of issues including the treatment of asylum seekers at the controversial Baxter Detention Centre in South Australia's outback, and campaigned for increased social housing for disadvantaged people and increased funds for child protection and for people with disabilities.  She also campaigned for equal rights before the law for same sex couples and sought to have South Australia's once ground breaking Equal Opportunity law updated.

Reynolds was described by Greg Kelton, the senior political writer with Adelaide's only daily newspaper as having "a finely tuned social conscience and has not been scared to tackle humanitarian issues such as refugees and asylum seekers".

The popularity of the Democrats had dropped significantly by the time of the 2006 election, with the party having lost all four senators up for re-election at the federal election in 2004. The retirement of fellow Democrat MLC Ian Gilfillan saw Reynolds preselected in the top position of the Democrat ticket, but the party faced a major struggle to retain even one seat. The party's vote dropped from 7.3% to 1.8% on election day, and Reynolds lost her seat. The loss of both the party's seats up for re-election saw Sandra Kanck become the only remaining Democrat MLC in the Legislative Council.

Reynolds (McPhee) is an approved Community Visitor with the Community Visitor Scheme and is a Committee Member of the Unley Road Association Incorporated. Reynolds was variously Secretary and President of Desert Challenge Inc. from 2008 to 2018. From 2007 to 2009, Reynolds served as a board member of Arts Access SA Inc.

She now works as a freelance governance consultant for small not-for-profit organisations.

References

External links
Kate Reynolds website
South Australian Democrats Biography
https://www.linkedin.com/in/kate-reynolds-mcphee-australia/

1962 births
Living people
Australian Democrats members of the Parliament of South Australia
Members of the South Australian Legislative Council
21st-century Australian politicians
21st-century Australian women politicians
Women members of the South Australian Legislative Council